Round Lake High School, officially Round Lake Senior High School, and commonly RLHS, is a public four-year high school located in Round Lake, Illinois, a northern suburb of Chicago, in the United States. It is part of Round Lake Area Schools District 116.

Athletics
Round Lake competes in the Northern Lake County Conference. Their nickname is the Panthers. The following IHSA sanctioned sports are offered:

Baseball (boys)
Basketball (girls & boys)
Bowling (girls)
Cross Country (coed)
Competitive cheerleading (coed)
Football (coed)
Soccer (girls & boys)
Softball (girls)
Tennis (girls & boys)
Track (girls & boys)
Volleyball (girls)
Wrestling (boys)

Notable alumni

 Tim Unroe, Former MLB infielder (Milwaukee Brewers, Anaheim Angels, Atlanta Braves)
 Tom Wittum, all-pro punter for San Francisco

References

External links
 Official website

Public high schools in Illinois
Educational institutions established in 1954
Schools in Lake County, Illinois
1954 establishments in Illinois